Parapercis atlantica is a fish species in the sandperch family, Pinguipedidae. It is found in Cape Verde.

References

Quéro, J.-C. and J.E. Randall, 1990. Mugiloididae. p. 892. In J. C. Quéro, J. C. Hureau, C. Karrer, A. Post and L. Saldanha (eds.) Check-list of the fishes of the eastern tropical Atlantic (CLOFETA). JNICT, Lisbon; SEI, Paris; and UNESCO, Paris. Vol. 2.

Pinguipedidae
Taxa named by Léon Vaillant
Fish described in 1887
Fish of West Africa